Speaking and Language: Defence of Poetry is a book of criticism by Paul Goodman that blames academic, structured approaches to linguistics for diminishing the role of creativity and spontaneity in speaking and human nature.

Publication 

Random House first published the book's hardcover cloth edition in January 1972, though the official publication date had listed November 1971. A paperback edition by Vintage Books followed in August 1972. Speaking and Language released in the United Kingdom in 1973.

References

Further reading

External links 

 

1971 non-fiction books
American non-fiction books
English-language books
Random House books
Books by Paul Goodman